Chelmsford station is a shelter flag stop Via Rail station located in Chelmsford, Ontario, Canada, on the Sudbury – White River train. The station originated as a part of the Canadian Pacific Railway system and is noted on maps as early as 1883–85.

References

External links

Via Rail stations in Ontario
Railway stations in Greater Sudbury
Canadian Pacific Railway stations in Ontario